Galahad are an English progressive rock band formed in 1985. They have released 11 studio albums, 6 live albums and 3 rarities collections as well as a couple of offshoot project albums in the guise of the Galahad Acoustic Quintet and the Galahad Electric Company. Over the last 38 years they have played with the likes of Pendragon, IQ and Twelfth Night. Galahad have performed their own shows and at festivals in Europe and North America, and have sold tens of thousands of albums despite never having had a major record deal. All releases are on their own 'Avalon Records' imprint other than some re-issues which are released in association with Polish label 'Oskar Productions'. 

In 2012 and after 27 years of existence Galahad released their first ever vinyl LP 'Battle Scars' in conjunction with Ritual Echo Records, on high quality 180 gram vinyl, in a gatefold sleeve, as a limited edition pressing of 300 which is already fast becoming a  collectors item. 
Since then the band has released several more albums on vinyl i.e. 'Beyond the Realms of Euphoria' (a double LP/EP album available on red/orange vinyl), 'Empires never Last' (double LP including an 'orchestral' version of the title track, available on blue or black vinyl), 'Seas of Change' (Standard single LP on black or turquoise blue vinyl and also on limited edition picture disc in a die cut sleeve) and in 2020 'Sleepers' on a double gatefold LP (available on standard black or white vinyl).

History
The band's vocalist Stuart Nicholson described Galahad's early days thus: "...the band was formed just after the so called second wave of ‘Prog’ bands such as Marillion, Pallas, IQ, Twelfth Night, Pendragon etc. of Prog bands came to the fore in the early Eighties. They all started around 1978 – 1981 and we started in 1985 after the bubble had effectively burst, but didn’t really get going seriously until 1990 onwards. To be honest we really did play just for fun in the early days and weren’t really that concerned about record deals etc. It was only after playing with some of the bigger bands when we thought. Actually, we are just as good as these guys so why not give it a go..."

Founder member Roy Keyworth left the band in March 2017. Producer Karl Groom filled in for Keyworth on the band's Quiet Storms album released in May 2017, but will not join the band full time.

Lee Abraham was officially announced as the new Galahad guitarist on 23 October 2017 after having already recorded all the guitar parts for their 2018 Seas of Change album, which was released in January 2018.

In 2020 Galahad released what was, ostensibly, a 21st anniversary edition of 'Following Ghosts. This expansive release brings together all of the ‘Following Ghosts’ related material and consists of a three CD package containing a completely new re-mix of the original ‘Following Ghosts’ album by Karl Groom who used digitised versions of the original 2" analogue multi-tracks in order to create the new 2019 mix. CD2, ‘Alternative Ghosts’, contains alternative versions of every track from the original album, again engineered and mixed by Karl Groom and featuring Mark Spencer playing bass guitar on a Galahad album for the very first time.  

Also included is a re-mastered version of the rather experimental ‘De-Constructing Ghosts’ album which was originally a separate companion release to the main album in 1999 under the guise of the ‘Galahad Electric Company’. This CD contains tracks written and arranged by various other musicians, DJs and re-mixers pieced together from the original Galahad ‘Following Ghosts’ multi-tracks resulting in completely different songs in most cases! 
In all this expanded release contains a whopping 37 tracks!

In many ways this was a comeback album, a fresh start after the difficult trials of the previous ‘Sleepers’ album. An album which seemed to polarise opinion at the time within Prog circles, mainly because of its diverse and, ironically, truly progressive nature. Two decades years later, we think it actually still sounds pretty fresh and perhaps will be assessed in a positive way in today’s more accepting musical climate as far so called ‘Progressive Rock’ is concerned.
  
This package includes new artwork, rare photos and notes by various band members and others who were involved at the time. The re-mixed version of the original album will also be released as a double LP on 180gm Gold vinyl in a gatefold sleeve at some point in the near future.

2020 also saw the re-release of 'Sleepers' on vinyl for the first time, 25 years after the original CD release, in conjunction with Oskar Records in Poland and including several extra tracks. The album was released as a double gatefold 2xLP on standard black or white vinyl. 

October 2020 saw the release of the first 'Galahad Electric Company' album in 21 years which was effectively a 'Covid lockdown' album written and recorded by Dean and Stu at their respective homes. Entitled 'When the Battle Is Over', it is one of the quickest Galahad related albums to have been written, recorded and released, writing having been only commenced in late April 2020. A second GEC album 'Soul Therapy' was released on 20 October 2021.

Galahad's eleventh studio album 'The Last Great Adventurer' features the band's longest-lasting line-up and was released on 24 October 2022. Another new studio album has been recorded and will be released towards the end of 2023.

Current members 
 Stuart Nicholson: vocals (since 1985)
 Spencer Luckman: drums (since 1987)
 Dean Baker: keyboards (since 1997)
 Lee Abraham: bass (2005–2009), guitar (since 2017),
 Mark Spencer: bass & guitar (2012–2014), bass (since 2018)
Occasional member on recordings only: Sarah Bolter: Flute, clarinet, alto and tenor sax, vocals (Since 1994)

Previous members 
 Roy Keyworth: guitar (1985–1998, 1999–2017)
 Paddy O’Callaghan: drums (1985–1987)
 John O’Callaghan: guitar (1985) (deceased)
 Mike Hooker: keyboards (1985–1987)
 Nick Hodgson: keyboards (1985–1987)
 Paul Watts: bass (1985–1989)
 Steve Pearson: drums (1987)
 Mike Hewetson: keyboards (1987–1988)
 Mark Andrews: keyboards (1988–1991)
 Pat McCann: bass (1989)
 Tim Ashton: bass (1989–1992, 2014-2017)
 Karl Garrett: keyboards (1991–1997)
 Neil Pepper: bass (1992–2002, 2009–2011) (deceased)
 Craig Wilson: guitar (1998–1999)
 Peter Wallbridge: bass (2002–2004)
 Mike Kneller: bass (2004–2005)

Timeline

Discography

Tapes 
 Studio 95 Demo, Autumn 1995
 One Knight at Mr Cs, August 1987
 In a Moment of Madness, May 1989
 Otherworldly Pleasures (Promo), January 1991
 Other Crimes and Misdemeanours, January 1992
 Suffering in Silence (Promo Only), February 1992
 Galahad’s Christmas Lecture, Spring 1993
 In a Moment of Complete Madness (Polish Version), April 1993
 Nothing Is Written (Polish Version), April 1993
 Other Crimes & Misdemeanours II, August 1995
 Not All There (Polish Version), September 1995
 Sleepers (Polish Version), September 1995
 Classic Rock Live (Polish Version), July 1996
 Following Ghosts (Polish Version), Autumn 1998

LPs 
 Battle Scars - Single Gatefold LP, April 2012
 Beyond the Realms of Euphoria - Double Gatefold LP/EP, October 2012
 Empires Never Last - Double Gatefold LP, October 2016
 Seas of Change - standard single LP on black or turquoise vinyl and picture disc , January 2018
 Sleepers - Double Gatefold LP on black or white vinyl, Spring 2020
 Following Ghosts (Original album re-mixed) - Double Gatefold LP on black, gold or orange/red vinyl, Autumn 2021

Singles 
 Dreaming From the Inside/The Opiate, July 1987
 Rollercoaster (single sided flexi single), February 1992
 Victory (Download only), June 2020

Studio CDs 
 Nothing Is Written, June 1991 (Japan version April 1992, remastered 2007)
 In a Moment of Complete Madness, April 1993, remastered 2008)
 Sleepers, September 1995 (Japan version April 1995, 20th anniversary, remastered October 2015)
 Following Ghosts, June 1998 (remastered reissue 2007; expanded edition September 2020)
 Year Zero, September 2002 (10th anniversary expanded and remastered edition September 2012)
 Empires Never Last, Spring 2007 (deluxe edition, remastered January 2015)
 Battle Scars, April 2012
 Beyond the Realms of Euphoria, October 2012
 Empires: A Curious Companion, (Issued free with Empires Never Last deluxe edition) January 2015
 Quiet Storms, May 2017
 Seas of Change, January 2018
 The Last Great Adventurer, October 2022
 The Long Goodbye, ???2023

Live CDs 
 Classic Rock Live, April 1996, Japanese version September 1996  
 Resonance - Live in Poland, 2006
 Two Classic Rock Lives, 2008
 Sleepless in Phoenixville - Live at Rosfest, October 2009
 Whitchurch Live 92/93 - Live Archives Vol. 2, February 2012
 Solidarity - Live in Konin, September 2015

EPs 
 Voiceprint Radio Sessions EP, January 1994
 Seize the Day, February 2014
 Guardian Angel, June 2014
 Mein Herz brennt, October 2014 (single)
 30, July 2015

Compilation CDs 
 Decade (Germany only), March 1997
 Other Crimes and Misdemeanours II, May 1997
 Other Crimes and Misdemeanours III, September 2001
 Other Crimes and Misdemeanours, 2008
 Other Crimes & Misdemeanours II & III, 2009
 When Worlds Collide, Winter 2015

Downloads/Streams 
 Empires Never Last, Spring 2007
 Galahad’s Christmas Lecture, Spring 2012
 Battle Scars, April 2012
 Beyond the Realms of Euphoria, October 2012
 Seize the Day EP, February 2014
 Guardian Angel EP, Summer 2014
 Mein Herz brennt EP, Autumn 2014 
 Empires Never Last - The Deluxe edition, January 2015
 Empires: A Curious Companion, January 2015
 Seas of Change, January 2018
 Following Ghosts - Expanded Edition, September 2020
 Resonance - Live in Poland 2006, December 2020

Spin-off projects
 Not All There CD (Galahad Acoustic Quintet) January 1995
 De-Constructing Ghosts CD (Galahad Electric Company) August 1999 (Re-mix album)
 When The Battle Is Over CD/Download/stream (Galahad Electric Company) October 2020
 Soul Therapy CD/Download/stream (Galahad Electric Company) 20th October 2021

DVDs 
 Resonance – Live in Poland, 2006
 Whitchurch 92/93 - Live Archives Vol. 2, February 2012 (Digipack)
 Solidarity - Live in Konin, September 2015 (Digipack)

Other recordings 
 The Ceiling Speaks - for Geoff Mann tribute album 'Mannerisms', 1994
 The Chamber of 32 Doors - for Genesis tribute album 'The River of Constant Change', 1996
 Lady Fantasy  - for Camel tribute album 'Harbour of Joy', 1996
 Fact and Fiction  - for Twelfth Night re-issue of 'Fact and Fiction - The Definitive Edition', 2018

References

External links
;
 

English progressive rock groups
Musical groups established in 1985
1985 establishments in England